Daniel Vosovic (born March 25, 1981) is an American fashion designer and a finalist in season 2 of the reality show Project Runway.

Biography
Vosovic was born March 25, 1981 in Grand Rapids, Michigan and raised in the nearby city of Lowell. He is of Serbian and Slovak background.

He graduated from Grand Rapids Community College before attending the Fashion Institute of Technology in New York City. He also received additional formal and on-the-job training at Gorland/Ittiere in London and through fashion seminars by Li Edelkoort in Florence, Milan, and Paris. In 2006 he came in 2nd in the 2nd season of Project Runway.

Vosovic is openly gay and lives in New York City. He has published a book, Fashion Inside Out, with a foreword by Tim Gunn. It was released on October 28, 2008. He appeared in singer Anya Marina's music video of her cover of "Whatever You Like," by T.I. The video was posted to YouTube on Nov. 12, 2009.

The 2009 premiere of Project Runway's sixth season was preceded by a two-hour special episode of Project Runway: All-Star Challenge where eight past contestants competed in one challenge for a cash prize of $100,000. Vosovic won the challenge.

Daniel launched his own fashion line in 2009 and has consistently released collections each season since then.

In 2012, Vosovic was accepted into the class of ten designers for the two-year CFDA Fashion Incubator program.

References

External links
Official site: THE KIT by Daniel Vosovic
Biography on official Project Runway site

1981 births
American fashion designers
American people of Serbian descent
Fashion Institute of Technology alumni
American LGBT broadcasters
LGBT fashion designers
LGBT people from Michigan
American LGBT writers
Living people
People from Lowell, Michigan
Project Runway (American series) participants
Grand Rapids Community College alumni
People from Grand Rapids, Michigan
21st-century American LGBT people